Pühalepa-Harju (Harju until 2017) is a village in Hiiumaa Parish, Hiiu County in northwestern Estonia.

Poet and children's writer  (1901–1941) was born in Harju village.

References

Villages in Hiiu County